Jess Smith BEM (born 1948) is a Scottish writer and storyteller.

Her work focuses on the experiences of Scottish travellers. As of 2018, she has published six books, including an autobiographical trilogy recalling her own childhood experiences, and a booklet on Traveller Dialects (with co-author Robert Dawson). In 2014 she led a campaign to save the Tinkers' Heart, a Scottish travellers' monument in Argyll, Scotland.

Biography 
Smith was born in Aberfeldy in 1948. From a Scottish traveller family, she lived with her seven sisters and parents in a single decker blue Bedford bus from the ages of five to 15. Smith lives in Perthshire and is married with three adult children; 2 sons and a daughter. She is patron of the young travellers' rights organisation Article 12.  In 2012, Article 12 won the Herald Society Equalities Project of the Year Award.

Tinkers' Heart campaign 
In 2012 scheduled monument status for the Tinkers' Heart was proposed however the application was declined as Historic Scotland indicated that it did not meet the criteria for a monument of national importance. In 2014 Smith launched a campaign to have this decision overturned, and in June 2015 the Heart became a scheduled monument.

Bibliography 
 The Scottish Traveller Dialects (with Robert Dawson) 2002
 Jessie's Journey 2002
 Tales from the Tent 2003
 Tears for a Tinker 2005
 Bruar's Rest 2006 
 Sookin' Berries 2008
 Way of the Wanderers 2012

References 

Scottish Travellers
Scottish writers
British storytellers
Women storytellers
1948 births
Living people
People from Perth and Kinross